Vajram is a 2015 Indian Tamil-language comedy-drama film directed by Ramesh Selvan. The film revolves around the four boys who want to get revenge on a corrupt minister. It stars Kishore, Sree Raam, Pandi, and Kuttymani, in the lead roles, while Pavani Reddy, Jayaprakash, Thambi Ramaiah, and Mayilsamy play supporting roles. The music composed by F. S. Faizal with editing done by Marish and cinematography by A. R. Kumaresan. The film was released on 27 February 2015 with negative reviews.

Plot 
The movie opens up intriguingly at a juvenile prison, where four teenage boys – Aravind (Kishore), Madurai (Sree Raam), Pandi (Pandi), and Kuttymani (Kuttymani) – land up there on charges of raping their classmate. A brief gloomy segment reveals that they torture the inmates of juvenile homes undergo at the hands of the wardens. Meanwhile, we see a police officer (Pondy Ravi), who is the benami of a greedy minister named Selvanayagam (Jayaprakash), who has entrusted him with a 100 crore property, and the former wants to usurp it. He hatches a plan and picks up the four boys for his own benefit and asks them to kidnap Selvanayagam. Little did he realize that the convicted boys already have a score to settle with Selvanayagam, who was responsible for them landing up at prison. With their own agendas set, they kidnap Selvanayagam's daughter Yazhini (Pavani Reddy) and take her hostage in a forest. Did the boys manage to take revenge on the minister and how they accomplish it narrated in violent ways forms the rest.

Cast

Critical response 
The film received negative reviews. Deccan chronicle wrote:"Had the director infused a clearer and believable screenplay, the film would have ended up a decent entertainer". Hindu criticised stating that "it is a difficult film to sit through. It could have been a lot more interesting had it simply concerned itself with the problems in juvenile detention centres. But in its present form, the film’s idealistic message isn’t new and neither is the means it employs to make it".

Production 
The gang of four after Pasanga, Goli Soda, teamed up again in Vajram. Newcomer Pavani reddy is the female lead. Jayaprakash has done a negative role in the film. Thambi Ramaiah scores as a supporting character. The filming was held at Assam forests.

Release 
The satellite rights of the film were sold to Raj TV. The film was initially given an A certificate by the Indian Censor Board for violence; however, it was re-censored and was given a U certificate.

References

External links 
 

2010s Tamil-language films
2015 films
Films about the education system in India
Films directed by Ramesh Selvan